Karapuzha Dam located in the Wayanad district of Kerala, is one of the biggest earth dams in India. Karapuzha Dam is located in the greenish and natural regions of Wayanad, Kerala on the Karapuzha River, a tributary of the Kabini River. Construction on the dam began in 1977 and it was complete in 2004. The purpose of the dam is irrigation and it left and right bank canals are still under construction.

Gallery

References

External links

Dams in Kerala
Dams completed in 2004
2004 establishments in Kerala
Earth-filled dams
Buildings and structures in Wayanad district
Geography of Wayanad district